is a continuation of the "Cinematic Soccer" series of games that started on the Famicom. Released in 1990 by Tecmo, this game is similar to its predecessor but with some slight graphical improvements. It was the last Tsubasa game to be released on the Family Computer, with the series moving to the Super Famicom two years later.

Plot

Three years after winning the France World Cup for Japan, Tsubasa Oozora moves to Brazil alongside his coach Roberto Hongo in order to play with São Paulo F.C. Tsubasa intends to help São Paulo F.C. beat Flamengo and win the Brazilian National Tournament. After defeating the other Brazilian clubs in the Rio Cup, Tsubasa finally makes it to the finals against Carlos' Flamengo. Tsubasa wins the Rio Cup and is then approached by Mr. Katagiri.

Gameplay

The game is a soccer simulation. There are different types of soccer moves that the player may choose, which consume the player's "guts" (energy). The player can choose to tackle, dribble, shoot, intercept, block or simply do nothing. Additional moves are possible depending on the position of the ball. When the ball is low, the player can do a volley shot, trap the ball, or clear. Alternatively, when the ball is high the player can choose to shoot with a header (or a bicycle kick with selected players), trap the ball, or clear. As the goalkeeper, the player can either punch the ball or catch it. Some player characters also have special moves which consume more "guts". For the player "guts" are very limited but the computer may use their special moves infinitely.

When playing the story mode of the game the player must win each match to progress. If the player loses, they must play the previous match again. Whether a player loses or wins, their characters level up to a maximum level of 500. Characters level up more when matches are won than when matches are lost.

Music 
The original score for the game was composed by Keiji Yamagishi, Mayuko Okamura and Mikio Saito (Metal Yuki.) Most of the songs that play during the game's Cinema Displays were created by Mayuko Okamura. Mikio Saito composed the song for the Flamingo team (in this game the music changes according to the team in control of the ball.) All the other songs, sound effects, and sound programming in the game were created by Keiji Yamagishi.

Some of the music in this game are remixed versions from its predecessor. Such as:
The enemy theme from the Rio Cup is remixed from the enemy theme from the National Tournament in the original Captain Tsubasa video game.
The enemy theme from the High Schools Tournament is remixed from the Enemy theme from the World Tournament in the original Captain Tsubasa video game.
Hyuga's theme is remixed from his theme in the original Captain Tsubasa video game.
The Penalty Shootout theme is remixed from its theme in the original Captain Tsubasa video game.

Glitches
In the English version of the game a glitch occurs in the fourth match occurs if the player uses a super skill before or within the extra time. The giltch removes the visuals from the screen, leaving only the soccer ball moving around on a black background.

Legacy

The game received several fan translations, mostly for languages with a dub of the animated series being popular in, such as Arabic, English, Turkish, and Persian.

References

Super Striker
1990 video games
Tecmo games
Nintendo Entertainment System games
Nintendo Entertainment System-only games
Japan-exclusive video games
Sports video games with career mode
Video games developed in Japan
Video games scored by Keiji Yamagishi